Gregory Gray (20 May 1959 – 25 April 2019), born Paul Lerwill, was a Northern Irish singer and songwriter. He began his career as a member of Rosetta Stone, a 1970s boy band, and became an influential cult musician who made indie music and videos under the pseudonym Mary Cigarettes. He published his work on online platforms such as YouTube and SoundCloud. During the course of his career his musical style ranged over an eclectic spectrum of pop, post-punk, indie rock, electronic dance music, jazz and folk. 

His post-punk band Perfect Crime was a support act for U2, Eurythmics, Talking Heads, and OMD.

Early life

Lerwill was born in Portrush, a seaside town in County Antrim, Northern Ireland, on 20 May 1959 as Paul Lerwill. His mother was English and his father was Anglo-Indian. He had three brothers and a sister. When Lerwill was 10 years old, the family moved to Singapore, where they lived at the RAF Changi airbase for three years, as his father was stationed there with the British Royal Air Force. It was there that he learned to play the guitar.

On returning to Portrush, as a 14-year-old he accompanied the "Singing Farmer" John Watt on the guitar in the Northern Star pub in Ballymoney, which Lerwill's father owned. He also worked in amusement arcades in Portrush and as a DJ in Kelly's, a local nightclub. When he left school at 16, he moved to Edinburgh, Scotland, where he worked as a DJ until he was 19.

Recording career
Lerwill started his recording career as a guitarist with the boy band Rosetta Stone, originally called the Young City Stars, in 1979. The band was managed by Tam Paton, the former manager of the Bay City Rollers. Lerwill was a replacement for Ian Mitchell, who had performed with both the Bay City Rollers and Rosetta Stone.

He recorded with the band and spent two years touring around the world with it. Rosetta Stone's output was mainly cover versions of 1950s and 1960s pop hits. In the UK they appeared on the children's TV programme Crackerjack. The only country where they were very successful was Japan, where they performed sold-out shows in arenas that could accommodate 6,000 people.

In 1981, he left Rosetta Stone, returned to Northern Ireland, and changed his name to Gregory Gray to disassociate himself from his pop boy-band past.

Perfect Crime 

Gray formed Perfect Crime, a four-piece post-punk band, for which he was the lead singer, guitarist, and songwriter, in 1981. The other original members of the group were Donal Boyle (guitar), George Nelson (bass), and Pete Kerr (drums). The group released two singles on MCA records, "Brave" in 1983 and "I Feel Like an Eskimo" in 1984, before breaking up in 1984. The band was promoted in the UK and gave performances on television. A rehearsal space was provided for the group by Dominican nuns in Portstewart.

The group was a support act for U2, Eurythmics, Orchestral Manoeuvres in the Dark (OMD), Talking Heads, and Paul Young. On their own, they toured the UK, often performing in university towns and small venues in rural Northern Ireland. In provincial regions, Gray's flamboyant style was often the target of hecklers, to whom he dealt sharp-witted put-downs.

Perfect Crime was an opening act for U2 on the first leg of the War Tour international concert tour on 28 March 1983 at the Nottingham Royal Concert Hall. Along with Steel Pulse, Big Country, Eurythmics, and Simple Minds, Perfect Crime performed before a crowd of 15,000 on 14 August 1983, at a nine-hour concert at Phoenix Park Racecourse, Dublin, when they were supporting U2 on a later leg of the War Tour. It was described by RTÉ as "the rock event of the year". Perfect Crime's set received positive press reviews.

Solo career 

Gray was signed as a solo artist to CBS Records in 1985. His album Think of Swans was released in 1986. It was produced by Walter Samuel and featured the double-bass player Danny Thompson. Two singles, "Sensual" and "Books to Read Twice", were released from the album. A music video of "Sensual" was aired regularly on MTV. Gray made appearances on UK television and radio shows, including being interviewed by Eamonn Holmes and on The Dave Fanning Show. He toured venues in England and Northern Ireland. However, the album did not sell well enough, and his contract was cancelled the same year. 

His second solo album, Strong at Broken Places, was produced by Davitt Sigerson and released by Atco Records, a subsidiary of PolyGram, in 1990. Sigerson became the CEO of EMI in 1994, and he signed Gray to that label, on which he released Euroflake in Silverlake in 1995. It was produced by Stephen Hague. Its title is a reference to the Silverlake gay district of Los Angeles. These two albums were released in the United States, mainland Europe, and East Asia, but not in the UK. They received favourable reviews in Rolling Stone and were popular on US student radio. They were a hit in Japan and sold well in southern Europe.

Mary Cigarettes

In the late 1990s, Gray and his partner moved from Northern Ireland to Hertfordshire on the outskirts of London, where they bought a home and built a music room where Gray created his own work independently. He began to make his work available for free on platforms such as SoundCloud and YouTube, under the deliberately ambiguous nom de plume Mary Cigarettes; he continued to use the name Gregory Gray in his personal life.

As Mary Cigarettes he became more adventurous and experimental, embracing a diverse range of styles, including indie pop and rock, techno, jazz, and folk. He collaborated with Fish Go Deep, a duo from Cork, creating electronic dance music. His music was admired by the British musician and radio presenter Tom Robinson, who played Mary Cigarettes' tracks on his programme on BBC Radio 6 Music.

In 2012, Noel McLaughlin, a senior lecturer in film, television, and popular music at the University of Northumbria, and Martin McLoone, Emeritus Professor in Media Studies at the University of Ulster, published the book Rock and Popular Music in Ireland Before and After U2 with a chapter dedicated to the work of Gray as a solo artist working under his own name, his work with Perfect Crime and his work under the Mary Cigarettes nom de plume.

Musical style
During the course of his career, Gray's musical style ranged over an eclectic spectrum of pop, post-punk, indie rock, electronic dance music, jazz and folk.

Personal life

While Lerwill was in Rosetta Stone he had a romantic relationship with Tam Paton, the band's manager, and became involved with a hedonistic social circle that included Freddie Mercury. 

After leaving Rosetta Stone in 1981, he legally changed his name to Gregory Gray to put that period of his life behind him. 

He came out publicly as gay in the mid-1980s; he was the first well-known Irish musician, north or south, to do so. Although he was openly gay and some of his songs and videos had gay themes, he didn't brand himself as a "gay artist" as he did not want to be constrained by labels. Nevertheless, he has been referred to as a "gay icon" in the media.

In the mid-1980s he bought a small, isolated farm and cottage on the North Antrim coast, which he used a base for writing and recording. After being dropped from the CBS label in 1986, he retreated to the farm for several months.

After a short illness, Gregory Gray died on 25 April 2019 at his home in Hertfordshire that he had shared with his partner for over 20 years. Following his wishes, he was cremated with no funeral service as he did not want anyone "crying over the coffin".

Discography (selected)

Bibliography
 McLaughlin, Noel; McLoone, Martin (2012) "Roads not taken? Gregory Gray" in Rock and Popular Music in Ireland: Before and After U2, Chapter 10, pp. 253–276. Dublin / Portland, Oregon: Irish Academic Press

References

External links 
 BBC Radio 4 Last Word – Gregory Gray Obituary – Radio broadcast on BBC Sounds (7 min)
 Gregory Gray Tribute – Tom Robinson Show (BBC 6, 4 May 2019) – Radio broadcast on Mixcloud (60 min)
 mary cigarettes – Soundcloud.com 
 mary cigarettes – YouTube
 mary cigarettes at Wordpress.com 

1959 births
2019 deaths
People from Portrush
British people of Anglo-Indian descent
People of Anglo-Irish descent
Musicians from County Antrim
LGBT singers from Northern Ireland
LGBT YouTubers
Atco Records artists
CBS Records artists
EMI Records artists
MCA Records artists
Singer-songwriters from Northern Ireland
British indie rock musicians
British post-punk musicians
British male singer-songwriters
Gay musicians from Northern Ireland
YouTubers from Northern Ireland
Gay singers
20th-century LGBT people from Northern Ireland
21st-century LGBT people from Northern Ireland